Nokia Lifeblog is a discontinued multimedia diary and website administration tool that automatically collects all the photos, videos, and sound clips that the user creates on the mobile phone, text messages and MMS messages that were sent and received. It also allows the user to create text and audio notes.  It organizes all the contents in a Timeline and renders the diary searchable via its contents and via automatically and manually created metadata, including time, location, tags, descriptions, filenames, sender and recipient information.

Lifeblog comprises a Microsoft Windows PC program and an S60 mobile phone application which synchronize with each other.  The PC application also allows the import of photos and other compatible items from devices other than mobile phones.

The PC version of Lifeblog can run independently of the phone version and was available from Nokia's Lifeblog page (now discontinued).

Both from the mobile phone Lifeblog application and from the PC Lifeblog application, users can post their data to Atom-enabled blogs such as LifeLogger, TypePad, LiveJournal, Jutut, LifeType, MediaBlog, and SaunaBlog. Photos can also be sent to a Flickr account.

Phones supported include:
 Nokia 3250
 Nokia 3230
 Nokia 6260 
 Nokia 6630
 Nokia 6670
 Nokia 6680
 Nokia 6681
 Nokia 6682 (Nokia Lifeblog application for use on Nokia 6682 phone is no longer available for distribution)
 Nokia 7610
 Nokia N70
 Nokia N71
 Nokia N72
 Nokia N73
 Nokia N75
 Nokia N76
 Nokia N77 
 Nokia N80
 Nokia N81
 Nokia N81 8GB
 Nokia N82
 Nokia N90
 Nokia N91
 Nokia N92
 Nokia N93
 Nokia N93i
 Nokia N95
 Nokia N95 8GB

Blog settings 

To post items to a blog from Lifeblog, you need to know the Atom server address. Here are some examples. These can also be used in Nokia Photos (for PC) and in Share Online (for S60 phones).

References

External links 
 Nokia Lifeblog Official Site
 Nokia Royal Artist Club
 How to  ...
 Blog settings

Communication software
Nokia services
Symbian software